Palace of the Dey, also known as Algiers Castle, is an Ottoman era palace in the city of Algiers, Algeria. Completed in the 16th century, it is situated inside the Casbah of Algiers, and settled by successive deys of the city. It once was the second largest palace in the Ottoman Empire, next to Topkapi Palace in Istanbul.

History
The palace became the seat of government of the Regency of Algiers in 1818, when Hussein Dey left Janina Palace for its more secure position. Hussein Dey had lived in the palace for 12 years. The palace witnessed the so-called "Fan Incident" in 1827 which became the indirect cause of the French declaration of war against Algeria.

Architecture
It is a fusion of several architectural styles, namely Moorish, Ottoman and European. The building consists of three floors with rectangle courtyard in the middle surrounded by suites, apartments, kitchens and hamams. Other facilities of the palace including two mosques, a diwan (public room), and an armory. The building was decorated by the Hispano-Moresque ware originated from Andalucia and popularized in Tunisia in the 15th century.

Condition
Although renovations has been conducted in 1979, 1989 and 2006, the palace still suffers from damages which lead to collapse of and major cracks on the wooden parts of the building. The collapse and cracks were resulting from the environment of the building where surrounded by the busy roads. Algerian government has been initiating an international team to conduct even more extensive renovation.

Gallery

References

Bibliography
Broussaud, (général), Les carreaux de faïence peints dans l’Afrique du Nord, Paris : Librairie Plon, « Collection du centenaire de l’Algérie », 1930
Marçais, G., L’architecture musulmane d’occident, Tunisie, Algérie, Espagne et Sicile, Paris : Arts et Métiers Graphiques, 1957 « Le palais du Dey d’Alger, splendeur et décadence » in Algeriantourism

Palaces in Algeria
16th-century establishments in Africa
Casbah of Algiers
Ottoman architecture in Algeria